The 2004–05 Slovak Cup was the 36th season of Slovakia's annual football knock-out cup competition and the twelfth since the independence of Slovakia. It began on 21 September 2004 with Round 1 and ended on 8 May 2005 with the Final. The winners of the competition earned a place in the second qualifying round of the UEFA Cup. Artmedia Petržalka were the defending champions.

First round
The thirteen games were played on 21 and 22 September 2004 and the match AS Trenčín – Slovan Bratislava was played on 29 September 2004.

|}

Second round
The match AS Trenčín – Slovan Bratislava was played on 6 October 2004 and the seven games were played on 19 and 20 October 2004.

|}

Quarter-finals
The first legs were played on 2 and 3 November 2004. The second legs were played on 9 and 10 November 2004.

|}

Semi-finals
The first legs were played on 6 April 2005. The second legs were played on 19 and 20 April 2005.

|}

Final

References

External links
profutbal.sk 
Results on RSSSF

Slovak Cup seasons
Slovak Cup
Cup